Stills is a 1975 studio album by American musician Stephen Stills. It is his third solo album and his first release on Columbia Records. The album was a commercial success on release, charting at number 19 on the US album charts, but was released to mixed critical reaction.

Background 
Stills began recording a solo album in 1973 under the tentative title As I Come of Age, and it was "almost completed" by February 1974. He may have recorded more in early 1974, but from May to December Stills was busy with a reunited Crosby, Stills, Nash and Young. Stills signed with Columbia early in 1975 and turned in this album, "a collection of tracks Stephen had been working on over the preceding several years" including "much of the material recorded for As I Come of Age". He recorded an early unissued version of "Guardian Angel" on January 23, 1975, at The Record Plant; the next day Crosby and Nash joined him.

Content 
The piano and drum tracks by Stills and Ringo Starr for "As I Come of Age" date back to 1971, while "Turn Back the Pages" was recorded in 1975. Although "My Angel" is credited to Stills and Dallas Taylor, and Stills calls it a "jam on a set of Dallas' changes", Stills recorded a demo of the song in March 1967. "First Things First" written by Stills and the bass player for Three Dog Night Joe Schermie and was played quite frequently along with the 'Myth of Sisyphus' and 'My Angel' on the CSNY 1974 tour.

The cover photo was shot at Neil Young's Broken Arrow Ranch during rehearsals for the CSNY 1974 tour. The back cover features Donnie Dacus and Stills playing acoustic guitars together.

As per the sleeve notes:

"Turn Back the Pages". 1975, Cut late in sessions, at Criteria, with Ron and Howie.

"My Favourite Changes". 1974, The track was cut in Sausalito with Stephen and Don Dacus playing guitars in the control booth and Leland Skar and Lala playing gin the studio. Danny Hutton put some vocals on it. Later in Colorado vocals were completed by Stephen, Kenny and Peggy Clinger.

"My Angel". 1974, Jam on a set of Dallas' changes edited into a song. Dallas played drums, Lala percussion. Stephen played bass, piano, clavinet and organ. Thanks to Sylvester.

"In the Way". 1974, Track cut live in studio in Sausalito and then Kenny recut the bass. Vocals, recorded by Jeff Geurico at Caribou, are Stephen, Don, and Kenny.

"Love Story". 1973, Back track is Russ on drums, Leland bass, Stephen piano. Organ and electric piano overdubs are also Stephen. Vocals, are Stephen, Rick, and Kenny and Don. Tried strings but to no avail. The vocals took twenty hours. The track took two hours. The song sat for four years before it was recorded.

"To Mama from Christopher and the Old Man". 1975.. Christopher was written after a long session where 7am caught Papa coming in the door just after Christopher was getting up and we hung out for a while. Cut the song that night and ended up with me and a drummer. Cut the basic, bass and second rhythm, then Tubby overdubbed the drums, with Stills hanging over his shoulder with a tambourine. We got smokin' and did it in eight hours, including mix down.

"First Things First". 1973. Dallas Taylor played drums, Joe Lala on percussion. Vocals are by Stephen, Kenny Passarelli, David Crosby and Graham Nash. A touch of Patoi.

"New Mama", 1973. Neil says this one his own way. The basic for this version was Leland on bass, Russ drums, Lala percussion and Stephen playing guitar and electric guitar simultaneously. Only instrument overdub is additional guitar by Don. Vocals are Stephen, Rick and Don.

"As I Come of Age", 1973. Track cut on London in 1971 with Stephen on piano and Ringo on drums. Stephen overdubbed organ and bass. Lead guitar is Don and vocals are by Crosby, Stills and Nash.

"Shuffle Just as Bad", 1974. Russ played drums, Jerry piano and organ. Stephen played bass on the basic and overdubbed guitar and electric piano. Vocals are by Stephen and Kenny.

"Cold Cold World", 1975. Another Donnie and Stephen collaboration, with Stephen doing lead vocal, Donnie and Betty Wright going backups. Stills on lead and rhythm guitars as well as bass. Old friend Conrad Isidore on drums, Joe's conga and percussion, Jerry on piano and organ, Donnie on rhythm guitar. Another Criteria track with Ron and Howie.

"Myth of Sisyphus", 1974. Jimmy Fox played drums and Stephen played piano and just sang the song. Cut in Miami by the Albert Bros., first take. Don and Claudia Lanier later got background vocals together with Halverson in Los Angeles.

Release 
The album was released 23 June 1975, and reached No 19 on the Billboard album charts during a chart run of 17 weeks, number 11 on the Record World charts and number 12 on the Cash Box charts. The lead single from the album was "Turn Back the Pages" and charted at a disappointing No 84 on the Billboard charts. In late 1975, CBS records were quoted saying it was close to reaching Gold in the US, with sales of 400,000-450,000. A quadraphonic version was also released in 1975.

Stills, supported the album with his longest tour as a solo artist, playing arenas throughout North America.

In retrospect Stills has commented on his mid-70's solo period saying he "short-circuited for a while, things were moving too fast. I got a little crazed. Too much drinking, too many drugs. What can I say."

Critical reception 

Critical reception to Stills was mixed to positive. Reviewing in 1975 for Rolling Stone, Bud Scopa called it a "concerted attempt at candid expression" but one resulting in "mixed, middling results". Record World said "Stills was back with that patented mellow sound" and cited "My Angel", "First Things First", and "Shuffle Just as Bad" as highlights. Cash Box said Stills "takes his best lyrical and instrumental chops to form a springboard from which he moves easily amid different musical shades", and pointed to "As I Come of Age" as a highlight. Village Voice critic Robert Christgau was largely unenthusiastic, describing the album as the one "in which Stills recycles his 'favorite set of changes/Already good for a couple of songs.' His admirers might find that endearing, I know. They might even dig him copping a lick from Alice Cooper later on in the lyric. But me, I find it pathetic." Chris Charlesworth wrote in Melody Maker 1975, saying 'CBS came up with the cash and Stills has come up with a good album, but which in the main doesn't rank with his classics, two or three tracks excepted. It's a laid-back record, to use a hackneyed term, and deliberately underproduced to the extent where the music oozes rather than bounces from the speakers." Record Mirror, called the album on par with his debut album, or a very close second. "Full of those earlier highlights - slow build ups, full of multi tracked vocals, familiar percussion breaks". Finishing the review by saying "maybe there's no new direction, but I always thought he found it somewhere years back and got lost in between." Music Week, called it a quality effort, saying "nobody plays the laid-back West Coast music better than Stills and the instrumentation throughout is joyously and smoothly integrated", and praised 'Love Story", 'First Things First', and 'New Mama", in particular.

Track listing

Personnel

Stephen Stills - Lead Vocals (1-12), Lead Guitar (1, 11), Rhythm Guitar (1, 6, 11), Guitar (2,10), Bass (1, 3, 6, 9-11), Piano (1, 3, 5, 9, 12), Clavinet (3), Organ (3, 5, 9), Electric Piano (5, 10), Tambourine (6)
Donnie Dacus - Rhythm Guitar (1, 11), Guitar (2, 8), Lead Guitar (9), Vocals (1, 4, 5, 8, 11, 12)
Tubby (Ron) Ziegler - Drums (1, 6)
Joe Lala - Percussion (1-3, 7, 8, 11), Conga (11)
Jerry Aeillo - Organ (1, 10, 11), Piano (10, 11)
Marcy Levy - Vocals (1)
Leland Sklar - Bass (2, 5, 8)
Danny Hutton - Vocals (2)
Kenny Passarelli - Bass (4), Vocals (2, 4, 5, 7, 10)
Peggy Clinger - Vocals (2)
Dallas Taylor - Drums (3, 7); co-wrote 'First Things First' under the pseudonym Jon Smith 
Russ Kunkel - Drums (5, 8, 10)
Rick Roberts - Vocals (5, 8), Guitar (?)
David Crosby - Vocals (7, 9)
Graham Nash - Vocals (7, 9)
Ringo Starr - Drums (9)
Betty Wright - Vocals (11)
Conrad Isidore - Drums (11)
Jimmy Fox - Drums (12)
Claudia Lennear - Vocals (12)
George Terry - Guitar, Vocals (named on the sleeve but not credited under any song)
Robert Margouleff - Mastering

Technical personnel
 Produced and arranged by Stephen Stills with Bill Halverson and Ron and Howie Albert.
 Engineers - Bill Halverson, The Albert Brothers, Jeff Guerico, Don Gehman, Stephen Stills
 Mix down Engineers - Stephen Stills, The Albert Brothers
 Mastering Engineer - Alex Sadkin
 Mastering - Robert Margouleff
 Management - Michael John Bowen
 Front cover photography - Joel Bernstein
 Back cover photography - Bill Ray
 Design - John Berg, Andy Engel

Charts

Tour 
The Stephen Stills 1975 Tour was a concert tour by American musician Stephen Stills, in support of his 1975 album, Stills. This was Stills biggest tour as a solo artist playing across North America. It was in support of his successful 1975 album, Stills, which he had just left Atlantic records and signed with Columbia Records with. During the tour he played to around 10,000 seater arenas. Reviews of the shows well mixed. The 8th December 1975 date at the Paramount Theatre, Seattle was professionally recorded. A version of "Know You Got to Run", recorded then, was used on Stills' Carry On boxset.

Personnel

1975 Summer Tour

 Stephen Stills - Vocals, Guitar, Piano
 Donnie Dacus - Guitar
 Joe Lala - Percussion
 Jerry Aeillo - Organ
 George Perry - Bass
 Ronald "Tubby" Zeigler - Drums
 Rick Roberts - Guitar

1975 Winter Tour

 Stephen Stills - Vocals, Guitar
 Donnie Dacus - Vocals, Guitar
 Joe Lala - Percussion
 George Perry - Bass
 Ronald "Tubby" Zeigler - Drums
 Jerry Aeillo - Keyboards

Setlist

1975 Summer Tour

All songs written by Stephen Stills, except where noted.

 Love the One You're With
 Johnny's Garden
 Closer to You
 Wooden Ships (Stills, David Crosby, Paul Kantner)
 Change Partners
 Know You Got to Run (Stills, John Hopkins)
 Treetop Flyer
 Myth of Sisyphus
 Everybody's Talkin' (Freddie Neil)
 Crossroads/ You Can't Catch Me (Robert Johnson, Chuck Berry)
 4+20
 Do for the Others
 Word Game
 Buyin' Time
 Going to the Country
 Colorado
 In the Way
 Black Queen
 The Loner (Neil Young)
 Turn Back the Pages (Stills, Donnie Dacus)
 New Mama
 The Treasure
 Suite: Judy Blue Eyes
 Find the Cost of Freedom

1975 Winter Tour

All songs written by Stephen Stills, except where noted.

 Love the One You're With
 Johnny's Garden
 Closer to You (Stills, Dacus)
 In the Way
 Wooden Ships (Stills, David Crosby, Paul Kantner)
 Change Partners
 Know You Got to Run (Stills, John Hopkins)
 Treetop Flyer
 Myth of Sisyphus
 Everybody's Talkin' (Freddie Neil)
 Crossroads/ You Can't Catch Me (Robert Johnson, Chuck Berry)
 4+20
 Do for the Others
 Word Game
 Instrumental/Band intros/Jam
 Buyin' Time
 Going to the Country
 Black Queen
 The Loner (Neil Young)
 Turn Back the Pages (Stills, Donnie Dacus)
 The Treasure
 Suite: Judy Blue Eyes
 Find the Cost of Freedom

References

1975 albums
Stephen Stills albums
Columbia Records albums